Lincoln Barrington "Sugar" Minott (25 May 1956 – 10 July 2010) was a Jamaican reggae singer, producer and sound-system operator.

Biography
After working as a selector on the Sound of Silence Keystone sound system, and then his own Gathering of Youth system, he began his singing career as part of The African Brothers in 1969, along with Tony Tuff and Derrick Howard. The group released several singles in the first half of the 1970s on labels such as Micron and their own Ital label, and were an early example of the Rastafari movement's influence on the Jamaican music scene, taking a clear lead from The Abyssinians. After recording "Mysterious Nature" for producer Rupie Edwards, the group recorded 1974's "No Cup No Broke" for Studio One, breaking up shortly after.
Minott then teamed up with the producer Clement "Coxsone" Dodd, as studio apprentice at Dodd's Studio One, working as a singer, guitarist and percussionist, and soon began recording his own singles. Minott developed a talent for writing new songs to fit over existing rhythms (which at the time was common when singers performed live, but rare in the studio), often proving more popular than the original songs, pioneering an approach that would be central to the emerging dancehall style.

After a number of moderately successful hits for Studio One, such as "Vanity", "Hang On Natty", "Mr. DC", and "Jah Jah Children", his debut LP Live Loving made his name and increased his popularity, and is regarded as pioneering the dancehall style that would dominate the early 1980s. It was followed in 1979 with a second album, Showcase, which included his singles that had been omitted from the first album.

The Bittersweet album followed, and then the third album of 1979, Ghetto-ology, which saw a return to roots reggae.  Roots Lovers (1980) saw a move towards lovers rock, which was a UK hit. He became a bigger star in the UK than in Jamaica, his self-produced "Hard Time Pressure" being a major UK reggae hit in 1980, leading Minott to relocate to the UK, where he became a focus for UK reggae.

Singles such as "Run Come", "Not for Sale", "African Girl", "Lovers Rock", "In a Dis Ya Time", "Africa" and "Make It with You" (with Carroll Thompson) were hits in the years that followed.  "Good Thing Going" (a cover of a song originally recorded by Michael Jackson in 1971) was picked up for distribution by RCA and reached Number 4 in the UK Singles Chart in March 1981, leading to an album of the same name. The Herbman Hustling album saw a return to dancehall and roots reggae.

He released an album of recordings from Channel One Studios, With Lots Of Extra in 1983, collecting several hits from his time working with Winston Holness.

Returning to Jamaica, his Youth Promotion sound system performed regularly in Kingston's Maxfield Park, featuring Jah Stitch and newcomers who had been nurtured by his organization such as Ranking Joe, Captain Sinbad, and Ranking Dread. His Black Roots label featured his productions of these artists plus others such as Barry Brown, Tenor Saw, Little John, Tony Tuff, Barrington Levy, Horace Andy, and one of his discoveries from England, Trevor Hartley. Minott also produced early works by Nitty Gritty, Junior Reid, Yami Bolo, Colourman, Daddy Freddy and Garnett Silk.

In 1980s he was working with producers in Jamaica including, Mikey Dread, George Phang, Sly & Robbie, Philip "Fatis" Burrell, Channel One, Prince Jammy, and Donovan Germain, as well as recording for United States-based Lloyd "Bullwackie" Barnes (the Wicked A Go feel It album from 1984). His biggest hits included "Herbman Hustling", "No Vacancy", "Jamming in the Street", "Rub A Dub Sound", "Buy Off The Bar", "Rydim", and "Devil's Pickney".

He linked up with Sly & Robbie for 1984's "Rub a Dub Sound Style" single, which is regarded as a prototype for the ragga style that developed in the mid-1980s.

Sugar Minott continued to record on his Black Roots label, Youth Promotion Label and for Major and Independent labels. His albums receive increasingly exciting reviews. He released over 60 albums and hundreds of singles.

Minott is one of the artists who appeared on the (2006) record, Radiodread, released by the Easy Star label, he provided the guest vocals on the song "Exit Music (For a Film)".

Minott's desire for independence led him to leave Studio One in 1978 and form his own Black Roots Records label and Youth Promotion organization, the latter with the aim of helping young singers from the same ghetto background as himself. Minott also ran the Youthman Promotion sound-system, giving young performers their first public exposure. Youthman Promotion has new selectors working alongside the veterans of Major Stitch, Ragga Steve and Drifter, Daddy Ants, Mr Shorty and Jimmy Knuckles. The selectors most recently added to the sound are DiGeneral Starry B in 2007, alongside Poochiny and Jr War, who were added in 2012. Ragga Steve has taken full control of the sound with Earl Minott in the UK.

Death
Minott died on 10 July 2010 at the University Hospital of the West Indies in St. Andrew Parish, Jamaica, after being admitted earlier that day. The cause of death remains undisclosed. He had been affected by a heart condition since early 2009, and cancelled several performances in May 2010 due to chest pains.

In May 2012, a charity concert was held at his former home commemorating his birthday, with Minott's children (who include daughter Tamar, aka Pashon) joined by Bounty Killer, Sizzla, Beenie Man, Junior Reid, Ken Boothe and John Holt. Proceeds went to the Youthman Promotions Music Centre and other causes helping local poor people.

In 2019, he was honoured with a Reggae Gold award by the Jamaican government for his contributions as artist and producer.

Discography
Live Loving (1977, Studio One) Roots Archives states 1977, Discogs says release year is unknown
Showcase (1978, Studio One, probably a smaller edition in Jamaica by Studio One already 1977,); reissued in US as Showcase (1992, Heartbeat) with different mixing; reissued as Jah Jah Children 2012
Black Roots (1979, Black Roots Records & Gorgon Records in Jamaica; 1979 by Mango for US and 1980 by Island Records for UK and (Germany) with other, shorter names on the 10 songs). The LP-album Black Roots, released for the Jamaican market on Black Roots Records, Gorgon Records and Thunder Bolt is dated 1978, so the album is recorded before the year 1979.
Bittersweet (1979, Gorgon Records in Jamaica; Warrior Records in UK); also released as Give The People (1979, United Artists Records) in UK
Ghetto – Ology (1979, Trojan) – reissued as Ghetto-ology + Dub (2000, Easy Star Records in US
Roots Lovers (1980, Black Roots); in Jamaica also released as Music for the Roots Lovers (1980?, Black Roots) with Sugar Minott & Black Roots Players 
African Girl (1981, Black Roots); pre-release album was produced and released 1980
Sweeter Than Sugar (1981, Sonic Sounds for Jamaica, Hummingbird Records for US and UK)
Good Thing Going (1981, RCA for UK); (1982 Heartbeat for US); Re-issued with smaller edits as Good Thing Going (1994, Black Roots Records)
 More Sugar Minott (1982, Studio One) – released on Jamaica
Dancehall Showcase (1983, Black Roots)
With Lots Of Extra (1983, Hitbound)
Herbman Hustling (1984, Black Roots)
Slice of the Cake (1984, Black Roots)
Wicked a Go Feel It (1984, Wackies)
Leader for the Pack (1985, Striker Lee)
Rydim (1985, Greensleeves)
Time Longer Than Rope (1985, Greensleeves)
Inna Reggae Dance Hall (1986, Black Roots)
Sugar & Spice (1986, Taxi)
Jamming in the Streets (1987, Wackies)
African Soldier (1988, Black Roots)
Buy Off De Bar (1988, Sonic Sounds)
Sugar Minott & Youth Promotion (1988, NEC)
Lovers Rock Inna Dance Hall (1988, Youth Promotion)
Sufferers Choice (1988, Black Roots)
Ghetto Youth Dem Rising (1988, Black Roots)
The Boss Is Back (1989, RAS)
Ghetto Child (1989, Black Roots)
Smile (1990, L&M)
A Touch of Class (1991, Jammy's)
Happy Together (1991, Black Roots)
Run Things (1993, VP)
Breaking Free (1994, RAS)
Stir it Up (feat. Daddy Freddy) (1994, Music of Life)
International (1996, RAS)
Musical Murder (1997, VP)
Good Thing Going (1998, VP)
Easy Squeeze (1999, World)
Simply the Best (2000), World
From the Heart (2000), Blackwacks
Leave Out a Babylon (2005), Discograph
In A Lovers Roots Style (2008), Pinnacle
Tribute to Studio One (2009), Tad's
New Day (2009), Stop Look Listen

Split albums
Rockers Award Winners (1985, Greensleeves) (Sugar Minott & Leroy Smart)
Double Dose (1987, Blue Mountain) (Sugar Minott & Gregory Isaacs)
Showdown Volume 2 (Channel One) (Sugar Minott & Frankie Paul)

Compilations
With Lots of Extra (1983, Hitbound)
Best of Vol 1 (1988, Black Roots)
Collectors Collection Vol 1 (1996, Black Roots)
RAS Portrait (1997, RAS)
Sugar Minott's Hidden Treasures (1999, Easy Star)
Hard Time Pressure: Reggae Anthology (2011, VP Records)

With the African Brothers

References

External links
Roots Archive discography
Interview by Ray Hurford

1956 births
2010 deaths
Musicians from Kingston, Jamaica
Jamaican reggae singers
Jamaican male singers
Island Records artists
Easy Star Records artists
VP Records artists
Heartbeat Records artists